Kerstin Tack (born 11 November 1968) is a German politician of the Social Democratic Party (SPD) who served as a member of the Bundestag from the state of Lower Saxony from 2009 until 2021. She is the Member of the German Bundestag for Stadt Hannover I in Lower Saxony.

Political career 
Tack first became a member of the Bundestag in the 2009 German federal election. She was a member of the Committee on Labour and Social Affairs.

In the negotiations to form a coalition government under the leadership of Chancellor Angela Merkel following the 2017 federal elections, Tack was part of the working group on social affairs, led by Karl-Josef Laumann, Barbara Stamm and Andrea Nahles.

In August 2020, Tack announced that she would not stand in the 2021 federal elections but instead resign from active politics by the end of the parliamentary term.

Other activities 
 Special Olympics Germany, Vice-President (since 2014)
 German United Services Trade Union (ver.di), Member

References

External links 

  
 Bundestag biography 

1968 births
Living people
Members of the Bundestag for Lower Saxony
Female members of the Bundestag
21st-century German women politicians
Members of the Bundestag 2017–2021
Members of the Bundestag 2013–2017
Members of the Bundestag 2009–2013
Members of the Bundestag for the Social Democratic Party of Germany